The 2017 New York City Public Advocate election was held on November 7, 2017.

Letitia James defeated challenger David Eisenbach in the Democratic Primary on September 12, 2017. As of 2022, James and then-City Comptroller Scott Stringer (2013) are the last citywide Democrats to carry Staten Island in a general election.

Results

References 

New York City Public Advocate
Public Advocate
Election Public Advocate
New York City Public Advocate elections